Association Sportive de Salé, commonly known as AS Salé, is a Moroccan football and basketball club based in Salé.
The club was founded in 1928.  They used to play their home games at Stade Marche Verte. The new field is located in Bettana. In 2004 AS Salé became vice-champion.

As of the 2021–22 season, Salé plays in the Botola 2, the second-highest league in Morocco.

Sport equipment
 Adidas

Achievements
Moroccan League Second Division: 1
1984

Current squad
As of 2 April 2014.

Managers
 Ivica Todorov (1995–96)
 Zaki Badou (1996)
 El Houssaine Ouchla (2011–13)
 Aziz El Khayati (June 12, 2013–Dec 12, 2013)
 Amine Benhachem (Dec 12, 2013–14)

See also 
 AS Salé (basketball)

Football clubs in Morocco
Sport in Salé
Association football clubs established in 1928
1928 establishments in Morocco
Sports clubs in Morocco